A guess is a conjecture or estimation. To "guess" is to make a prediction without sufficient information or knowledge.

Guess, GUESS, or Guessing may also refer to:

Guess (clothing), an American name-brand clothing line
Guess (variety show), a variety show in Taiwan
Guess (JoJo's Bizarre Adventure), a character in the Japanese manga JoJo's Bizarre Adventure

People
Alvaleta Guess (1955–1996), American stage/musical theatre actress
Carol Guess (born 1968), American novelist and poet
Elizabeth Guess (born 1985), American soccer forward and midfielder
Francis Guess (1946–2015), American businessman and civil rights advocate
Gene Guess (1932–1975), American lawyer and politician
George Guess (disambiguation)
 Sequoyah (c. 1770–1843), Cherokee silversmith, named in English George Gist or George Guess
 George W. Guess (1822–1868), mayor of Dallas, Texas, 1866–1868
Gretchen Guess (born 1969), American businesswoman and politician
Jeff Guess (born 1948), Australian poet
Sam C. Guess (1909–1989), American politician from the State of Washington

See also
GESS (disambiguation)
Güssing, a town in Burgenland in Austria
Güssing District, an area in Burgenland in Austria
Guessing Game (disambiguation)
Guesswork, a 2019 album by Lloyd Cole